Karin Stampfli (born 7 September 1963) is a Swiss former professional tennis player. She is now Karin Pelizzari.

Stampfli, a French Open junior semi-finalist, competed on the professional tour in the 1980s. The 1982 Swiss indoor champion, Stampfli featured in the qualifying draws of all four grand slam tournaments during her career. She had a win over Roland Garros champion Sue Barker at the 1984 U.S. Clay Court Championships.

References

External links
 
 

1963 births
Living people
Swiss female tennis players